Hinckley Township is one of the seventeen townships of Medina County, Ohio, United States, located in the northeast corner of the county.  The 2010 census found 7,646 people in the township.

Geography
Located in the northeast corner of the county, it borders the following townships and cities:
North Royalton, Cuyahoga County - north
Broadview Heights, Cuyahoga County - northeast
Richfield Township, Summit County - east
Bath Township, Summit County - southeast corner
Granger Township - south
Medina Township - southwest corner
Brunswick - west
Brunswick Hills Township - west

No municipalities are located in Hinckley Township.

Name and history
Hinckley Township was established in 1825.  Named for Samuel Hinckley, the original proprietor, it is the only Hinckley Township statewide.

Buzzards
The township became known across Ohio and the United States as the home of the buzzards. On March 15 of every year, buzzards arrive in large flocks at the town, as if on a very exact biological clock. The town began celebrating the arrival of the birds in 1957, and today as many as 50,000 visitors visit the Hinckley Reservation of the Cleveland Metroparks in the town annually on "Buzzard Day" to witness the return of the avian residents. The event is used to mark the beginning of spring for Hinckley and the surrounding towns.

Government
The township is governed by a three-member board of trustees, who are elected in November of odd-numbered years to a four-year term beginning on the following January 1. Two are elected in the year after the presidential election and one is elected in the year before it. There is also an elected township fiscal officer, who serves a four-year term beginning on April 1 of the year after the election, which is held in November of the year before the presidential election. Vacancies in the fiscal officer position or on the board of trustees are filled by the remaining trustees.

Notable residents
 Matt Tifft - NASCAR driver
Connor Cook - NFL quarterback
Valarie Jenkins, professional disc golfer and four-time PDGA World Champion
Avery Jenkins, professional disc golfer and 2009 PDGA World Champion
Dominique Moceanu - USA Olympic gymnast
Jim Donovan (sportscaster) - WKYC

References

External links
Township website
County website

Townships in Medina County, Ohio
Townships in Ohio